Tomáš Kříž (born 17 March 1959) is a retired Czech footballer.

During his club career he played for Dukla Prague. He won the Czechoslovak First League with them three times, in 1977, 1979 and 1982.

He earned ten caps for the Czechoslovakia national football team from 1981 to 1986, and participated in the 1982 FIFA World Cup.

References

1959 births
Living people
Czech footballers
Czechoslovak footballers
Czechoslovakia international footballers
1982 FIFA World Cup players
Dukla Prague footballers
FK Chmel Blšany players
2. Bundesliga players
Czechoslovak expatriate footballers
Expatriate footballers in West Germany
Czechoslovak expatriate sportspeople in West Germany
Association football forwards
Footballers from Prague